Ming Dynasty was a notable Australian Thoroughbred racehorse, who won the 1977 and 1980 Caulfield Cups.

Background
He was sired by Planet Kingdom (AUS), his dam Chow Mein (AUS) was by Chris (GB).

Part owned and trained by Bart Cummings from 76 career starts he won 17 races.

Racing career
As well as his two Caulfield Cups he also won two VRC Australian Cups (1978 and 1980), the 1978 AJC Queen Elizabeth Stakes and the Metropolitan Handicap in the same year.

As a seven-year-old in 1980 in the Caulfield Cup, starting at 50–1, the gelding carried 58 kg and beat Melbourne Cup winner, Hyperno, and champion Kingston Town to join an elite group to take two Caulfield Cups, the others being Rising Fast (1954–55), Whittier (1922–25), Uncle Sam (1912–1914), Poseidon (1906–07), Hymettus (1898–1901) and Paris (1892–1894).

Retirement
When retired from racing he became a clerk of the course mount at AJC meetings.

He died 28 May 2002.

References

1973 racehorse births
Thoroughbred family 8-k
Racehorses bred in Australia
Racehorses trained in Australia
Caulfield Cup winners